The True Creator is the debut studio album of D!v!s!on #9, released on July 23, 1996, by Full Contact Records. The track "Dub Altar" was contributed to the 1996 various artists compilation Echo, released by the same label.

Reception
In reviewing The True Creator, Aiding & Abetting said "this stuff doesn't get dull" and "Division #9 has done a fine job of traversing the wide expanses of the electronic music universe to craft these pieces." A critic at babysue called the album "minimal, rhythmic electronic heaven" and "the result is a very sensual, sexy batch of tunes that can either be listened to or played as background music."

A lukewarm response came from Sonic Boom, who commended the musical diversity in the compositions but claimed "it is nothing altogether new or innovative, but it something that Mick has never been able to do in the past and as a result his musical growth has more than shown through."

Track listing

Personnel 
Adapted from the liner notes of The True Creator.

D!v!s!on #9
 Mick Hale – instruments, production

Production and design
 Alan Douches – mastering
 Zalman Fishman – executive-producer
 Modern Design – design
 Shred (as Shred UK) – engineering

Release history

References

External links 
 The True Creator at Discogs (list of releases)

1996 debut albums
D!v!s!on No. 9 albums
Full Contact Records albums